Kapneh Karan (also Romanized as Kapneh Karān; also known as Kapneh Garān and Rostam Khān) is a village in Kalan Rural District, Zarneh District, Eyvan County, Ilam Province, Iran. At the 2006 census, its population was 663, in 121 families. The village is populated by Kurds.

References 

Populated places in Eyvan County
Kurdish settlements in Ilam Province